Wijaya Kusuma Stadium (Stadion Wijaya Kusuma) is a multi-purpose stadium in the town of Cilacap, Indonesia. The stadium has a capacity of 15,000 people.

It is the home base of PSCS Cilacap. The stadium is always full of spectators every time PSCS Cilacap play the home game.

References

Sports venues in Indonesia
Football venues in Indonesia